Decaisnina is a genus of semi-parasitic shrubs (mistletoes) that occur in Australia. The type species is D. glauca. Around thirty species are known, found from northern Australia to Tahiti and the Philippines.

Accepted species
(according to Plants of the world online)

References

External links
Decaisnina (Flickr images)
Decaisnina Occurrence data from Australasian Virtual Herbarium

 
Parasitic plants
Loranthaceae genera